Star Trek: The Role Playing Game is a role-playing game set in the fictional Star Trek universe published by FASA Corporation from 1982 to 1989.

History
Jordan Weisman of FASA sought out one of the biggest licenses in the space adventure genre – Star Trek – and received it in 1982. Weisman and L. Ross Babcock III looked out-of-house for a Star Trek design team. Over the next several months FASA rejected four different designs for the game, largely because they all focused too much on combat, which did not fit with Gene Rodenberry's vision of a more utopian future; the fifth design team, a freelance group that called themselves Fantasimulations Association, was finally able to provide a workable design, and this team consisted of Guy McLimore Jr., Greg Poehlein, and David F. Tepool. 

Star Trek: The Role Playing Game (1983) has a tactical combat system where battles are played out on a square grid. The system is based on a FASA board game called Grav-Ball (1982). 

The game was published as a boxed set with a 128-page book, an 80-page book, and a 56-page book, two counter sheets, and dice. Weisman and Babcock were insistent that the RPG not change into a board game when space combat occurred, so the Fantasimulations crew devised a system whereby each section head had their own "console" to operate during combat, and the captain oversaw and coordinated everyone, rather than doing everything himself. The supplement The Klingons (1983), co-authored by writer John M. Ford, was a book that notably influenced later Paramount productions. Paramount was unhappy with FASA's two Star Trek: The Next Generation supplements - including an Officer's Manual (1988) and First Year Sourcebook (1989) - which they felt did not entirely match their view of the Next Generation universe, and in 1989 Paramount pulled FASA's license for Star Trek.

Setting

Star Trek: The Role Playing Game is set in the Star Trek universe before Star Trek The Next Generation. Most player characters are members of Starfleet engaged in space exploration missions. They typically hold senior posts on a starship bridge and visit alien planets as part of landing parties.

The game's published supplements and modules are mostly set in the original crew movie era (AD 2280s/90s), but a few are set during the original TV era (AD 2260s) or a century later in the Next Generation era (AD 2360s/70s). See Official Supplements by era below.

FASA Trek vs. "canon" Trek
FASA designed their Star Trek game universe nearly five years before Star Trek: The Next Generation (TNG) (1987-1994). The designers built their game universe when there was no official canon, and they borrowed heavily from ideas in the Star Trek original series, the Star Trek animated series, fan fiction, and the works of Star Trek novelist John M. Ford.

Game elements which either were never introduced into what later became canon Star Trek, or which differ significantly from how canon Star Trek presents them, include:

John M. Ford's Klingons

The game's depiction of the Klingons, the result of work by science fiction author John M. Ford, differs from later canon. Ford's Klingons not only appear in the supplement The Klingons for the game, but also in his Star Trek novel The Final Reflection, which is told almost entirely from a Klingon perspective. Ford designed his Klingon society to provide a logical basis for the actions and statements of onscreen Klingons in the original TV series, as well as the differing appearance of the Klingons in the original series and those in Star Trek: The Motion Picture (the only movie featuring Klingons to have been released when the novel and game supplement were first published). The philosophy also motivates their actions on a personal scale, with individuals engaging in schemes and intrigues to enhance their personal power and that of their extended family, and generates traditions like starship officers being promoted as a result of assassinating their superiors.

The Klingons seen in Star Trek: The Motion Picture, or "Imperial Klingons", are the original natives of the Klingon homeworld Klinzhai. The ones seen in the TV series are "human-fusion" Klingons, a result of genetic engineering combining the DNA of humans and Imperial Klingons into a hybrid better able to work in environments occupied by humans and thought to better understand them (for purposes of fighting them). Romulan-fusion Klingons also exist (Ford's Klingons contacted the Romulans before humans) and possibly other hybrids (such as with the Orions, whose space abuts both the Empire and the Federation).

Ford's Klingons (at least those serving in their space fleet) believe that when they die they will serve in a "Black Fleet" in the afterlife. Given the fact that few stars are visible at night on most of Klinzhai due to cloud cover, they have a mystical reverence for "the naked stars" and believe they remember acts of courage performed under them.

In contrast, the Klingons in Star Trek: The Next Generation and subsequent TV series, as well as the later movies, have a culture and traditions based more on a cross between the vikings and Japanese Samurai (or, rather, Western imaginations of them), focused on personal and familial honor and placing value on sacrificing their lives for the causes they serve. The canonical Klingon Empire is governed by the High Council, led by a chancellor, instead of an emperor. Their language, tlhIngan Hol, is different from Ford's Klingonaase, and their homeworld is Kronos (Qo'noS in Klingon).  There was no canonical explanation for the differing appearance of Klingons in the original TV series compared to the movies and The Next Generation.  In the Star Trek: Deep Space Nine episode "Trials and Tribble-ations", the matter was joked about but left unexplained; in the Star Trek: Enterprise episodes "Affliction" and "Divergence", it is explained as an infection caused by an attempt to infuse Klingons with the DNA of Khan Noonien Singh (a variation of the human-fusion idea).

Romulans
When the game was published, the only filmed material featuring the Romulans were the two Original Series episodes "Balance of Terror" and "The Enterprise Incident". FASA's Romulans are the descendants of prehistoric Vulcans transplanted to the planet Romulus by the species known as the Preservers (mentioned in the TOS episode "The Paradise Syndrome"). Before developing interstellar travel, Romulan science concluded they were not native to their planet, leading to a social and religious goal of building a "Road to the Stars" to find the "gods" that placed them there, leading to the establishment of the Romulan Star Empire.

The Romulans are one of the Federation's chief antagonists in Star Trek: The Next Generation, featured in many episodes, and a canon explanation of their origin is given in that series. They are the descendants of Vulcans who did not agree with Surak's doctrines of logic and emotional suppression, instead choosing to leave Vulcan and travel through vast distances of space to their new home on Romulus. A similar concept was used by Diane Duane in Spock's World and the Rihannsu series of novels.

The Triangle
The game supplement Trader Captains and Merchant Princes, first published in 1983, introduced "the Triangle", a lawless area wedged between the space occupied by the United Federation of Planets, the Klingon Empire, and the Romulan Star Empire.

The Triangle supplement later introduced a set of color maps, allowing players to know exactly how long it would take them (in game time) to travel between star systems.

This lawless area was popular with players as it allowed them to escape the strict parameters of a military campaign. Most campaigns with civilian or non-Starfleet characters are based entirely or in part within the Triangle.

Ship classes
The game introduces a number of starship classes not based on those seen in the series, though many of them borrow from the starship design standards set in the original TV series and first two movies: Federation ships have saucer sections and outboard engine nacelles, Klingon ships have a primary hull with a command section at the end of a long boom, and Romulan ships look like birds.

They include, but are not limited to: the Bader-class scout, Baker-class destroyer, Chandley-class frigate, the Enterprise-class cruiser (the refitted Constitution-class introduced in Star Trek: The Motion Picture), Derf-class survey ship, Larson-class destroyer, Loknar-class frigate, Nelson-class scout, Northampton-class frigate, the so-called Reliant-class cruiser (the FASA name for the movie-era Miranda-class cruiser), the Mission-class transport, Royal Sovereign-class battlecruiser, M'benga-class hospital ship and the Sagan-class science ship (an upgrade of the canon Oberth-class starship).  A few designs were made for ships mentioned in canon but not seen. One of these was FASA's conjecture of the Ambassador-class starship, which resembles a modified Enterprise-class cruiser with Excelsior nacelles; in canon the Ambassador is a precursor to the Galaxy-class starships.

The distinct design of several of those ships, notably the Chandley-class frigate and the Loknar-class frigate, have made them popular in non-canon Star Trek folklore. The Loknar, which predates the NX-class starship design, bears a more than passing resemblance to the titular ship in Star Trek: Enterprise.

The Mission-class transport, a shuttle-style, warp-capable ship designed for small crews and short missions, is similar to the small, long-range, shuttle-style runabouts introduced in later Star Trek series. The FASA Mission-class transport predates it by more than a decade.

Stardates
The stardates in the original series are arbitrarily assigned but tend to be larger for episodes produced later in the series' run. FASA's game introduces the notion of reference stardates based on Gregorian dates, similar to a standard fan practice for constructing stardates. A date in or after the year 2000 in year 2XYZ, month MM, day DD becomes Stardate X/YZMM.DD. For example, FASA set the date of the detonation of the Genesis device in Star Trek II as Stardate 2/2206.20, corresponding to June 20, 2222. Dates before 2000 use negative numbers before the slash.

Beginning with Star Trek: The Next Generation, filmed materials assign stardates in a more systematic way. The first season of TNG has stardates of the form 41XXX.XX, with the numbers starting just above 41000.00 and increasing towards 41999.99 as the season progresses. Subsequent seasons have stardates beginning with 42, 43, etc. Star Trek: Deep Space Nine and Star Trek: Voyager used stardates corresponding to the season of TNG that was airing at the same time, then progressing forward after TNG went off the air (DS9 season 1's stardates began with 46, and Voyager season 1 episodes had stardates beginning with 48).

Star Trek historical timeline
A number of key dates in the FASA Star Trek universe are about 60 years out of phase with their equivalent dates in the canonical Star Trek universe. For example, the game dates the original five-year mission of the Enterprise from 2207 through 2212, while the canonical dates are 2265 through 2270. Also, the game takes most of its fictional history between the present day and the 23rd century from the Star Trek Spaceflight Chronology, the contents of which are almost totally contradicted by later canonical materials (especially the film Star Trek: First Contact and the series Enterprise).

Languages
Supplements to the basic game introduce players to the rudiments of the Romulan and Klingon languages. Neither language, as expressed in the game, is the same as later depictions in the Star Trek series.

System
Star Trek: The Role-Playing Game is a skill-based system in which character skills are determined by time spent in previous service. The rules cover character creation, familiar characters from the series, Vulcan telepathics, weapons and equipment, personal and spaceship combat, and encountering new civilizations. The boxed set includes three introductory scenarios and an 80-page pull-apart book of Enterprise deck plans.

The game system is percentile based. Success or failure is determined either by rolling against a set difficulty target, a player's skill, or a hybrid of both.

FASA had previously written supplements for GDW's Traveller, an association which influenced the early structure of the Star Trek game, particularly in character generation.

The rulebooks also provides systems for governing personal combat and exploration of space and planes, and the first edition provides rules for combat between starships; the second edition moves the starship combat rules into a separate board game. Supplements provide additional rules for characters in the Klingon Empire and Romulan Star Empire, interplanetary trade and commerce, starship design, and campaigns focusing on other non-Starfleet players.

Each planet in the game's atlas has a code that - coupled with the character's merchant skill and some luck - allow players to buy and trade across the galaxy. A ship's carrying capacity is not based on tonnage but on volume. There are also rules on buying and selling stock on the Federation stock market.

Character generation
Players roll dice to determine the beginning attributes of their character. Star Trek: The Role Playing Game characters begin with seven basic abilities - Strength, Endurance, Dexterity, Intellect, Luck, Charisma, and Psionic Potential. These attributes are adjusted depending on the character's species. (Vulcans, for example, gained a natural bonus to their Psionic Potential score, a measure of their heightened psionic skill.)

Players have the option of playing almost any humanoid species introduced in the original Star Trek TV series, the animated series, or the first four movies. These include Humans, Vulcans, Tellarites, Andorians, Orions, Klingons, and Romulans. Two other species introduced in the animated series, Caitians and Edosians, can also be played.

Players use dice rolls on various tables to determine skills acquired before joining Starfleet, and then those gained by their shipboard assignment (helm operations, sciences, medical, communications, etc.) during tours of duty, which also leads to increases in rank before determining their final posting for the start of play. Later supplements allow players to generate Starfleet Intelligence agents, Klingon and Romulan military personnel, Orion pirates, and civilian merchants.

Game statistics are provided for principal characters in the Star Trek TV series (Kirk, Spock, Dr. McCoy, Scotty, etc.), allowing players to play those roles instead of generating their own characters.

Starship Tactical Combat Simulator game
The first edition of the game includes a tactical starship combat game, which was later redeveloped into the Starship Tactical Combat Simulator.

The game's basic rule system provides a simple system for moderating space battles, in which each player assumed a role in the battle, typically by manning a station on the ship's bridge.

The Captain determines the strategy, the Engineer is responsible for power management and allocation to different systems such as weapons and shields, the Helmsman for firing weapons, the Navigator for managing deflector shields, and the Communications Officer for damage control.

FASA later developed that system into a more complex standalone game, the Starship Tactical Combat Simulator, similar to a tabletop wargame. During a role-playing session, if the adventure calls for a space battle, players have the option of using this standalone game to determine the outcome of the battle.

Official publications

Rulebooks
Star Trek: The Role Playing Game, 1st Ed. (1982)
Star Trek: The Role Playing Game, 2nd Ed. (1983)

Supplements

Set during the original series
U.S.S. Enterprise Deck Plans (supplement, 1983)
Klingon D-7 Battlecruiser Deck Plans (supplement, 1983)
Ship Construction Manual, 1st Ed. (supplement, 1983)
Ship Recognition Manual: The Federation, 1st Ed. (supplement, 1983)
Ship Recognition Manual: The Klingon Empire, 1st Ed. (supplement, 1983)
Star Trek Gamemaster's Kit (supplement, 1983)
Trader Captains and Merchant Princes, 1st Ed. (supplement, 1983)
The Four Years War (supplement, 1986)

Set in the movie era
The Klingons (supplement, 1984)
The Romulans (supplement, 1984)
Star Trek III Sourcebook Update (supplement, 1984)
Federation Ship Recognition Manual (supplement, 1985)
Klingon Ship Recognition Manual (supplement, 1985)
Romulan Ship Recognition Manual (supplement, 1985)
Ship Construction Manual, 2nd Ed. (supplement, 1985)
The Triangle (supplement, 1985)
The Triangle Campaign (supplement, 1985)
The Federation (supplement, 1986)
Klingon Intelligence Briefing (supplement, 1986)
The Romulan War (supplement, 1986)
Star Trek IV Sourcebook Update (supplement, 1986)
Klingons: Game Operations Manual (supplement, 1987)
Klingons: Star Fleet Intelligence Manual (supplement, 1987)
The Orions (supplement, 1987)
Regula-1 Orbital Station Deckplans (supplement, 1987)
Star Fleet Intelligence Manual - Game Operations (supplement, 1987)
Star Fleet Intelligence Manual - Agent's Orientation Sourcebook (supplement, 1987)
Trader Captains and Merchant Princes, 2nd Ed. (supplement, 1987)

Set in the TNG era
Star Trek: The Next Generation Officer's Manual (supplement, 1988)
Star Trek: The Next Generation First Year Sourcebook (supplement, 1989)

Adventures
Denial of Destiny (adventure, 1983)
The Vanished (adventure, 1983)
Witness For The Defense (adventure, 1983)
Demand of Honor (adventure, 1984)
Margin of Profit (adventure, 1984)
Orion Ruse (adventure, 1984)
Termination: 1456 (adventure, 1984)
Graduation Exercise (adventure, 1985)
The Outcasts (adventure, 1985)
Where Has All The Glory Gone? (adventure, 1985)
A Matter of Priorities (adventure, 1985)
A Doomsday Like Any Other (adventure, 1986)
Conflict of Interests (adventure, 1986)
Decision at Midnight (adventure, 1986)
The Dixie Gambit (adventure, 1986)
The Mines Of Selka (adventure, 1986)
An Imbalance of Power (adventure, 1986)
Old Soldiers Never Die (adventure, 1986)
Return to Axanar (adventure, 1986)
The Strider Incident (adventure, 1987)

Related publications

Star Trek III: Starship Combat Game Box Set (supplement, 1984)
The White Flame (scenarios for the Combat Simulator, 1987)
Stardate magazine, Vol. 1 (issue 1 - 8) and Vol. 2 (9-11) by FASA.

Reception
William A. Barton reviewed Star Trek: The Role Playing Game in Space Gamer No. 64. Barton commented that "I like this game. And I think you will, too, despite any picky points you can find that don't quite agree with your own concept of how a Star Trek game should be [...]  It has its flaws as does any system and it wasn't possible to cover every aspect of Star Trek in one game. But everything you really need for a satisfying Star Trek role-playing system is to be found here - in fact, just about everything you need for any SFRPG. So I recommend you not be put off by the high price of this package. [...] I think you'll be glad you entered the Final Frontier. This game, so far, is my pick of the best role-playing system of 1983."

Steve List reviewed Star Trek: The Role Playing Game in Ares Magazine #16 and commented that "Star Trek game is an ambitious work, generally well-done, with some minor flaws. The worst of these is in any case a matter of taste – the episodic nature of things versus the continuous campaign approach."

Russell Clarke reviewed Star Trek: The Role Playing Game for White Dwarf #58, giving it an overall rating of 9 out of 10, and stated that "Star Trek the RPG is a worthy addition to the SF role-playing genre and I highly recommend it."

William A. Barton reviewed Star Trek: The Role Playing Game, Second Edition in Space Gamer No. 71. Barton commented that "second edition Star Trek: The Role Playing Game is an even better avenue to gaming the final frontier than its predecessor.  Those who own the original won't need this edition to continue to play, as both are compatible, but will certainly find enough new material that they won't be sorry for buying it. If you haven't yet tried ST:RPG - especially if you're new to SF roleplaying - I recommend this game over its competitors for ease of play, consistency, and sheer enjoyment."

Steve Nutt reviewed Star Trek: The Role-Playing Game for Imagine magazine, and stated that "The game places great emphasis on role-playing. If your group is hack and slash then they had better change their approach before they play Star Trek. Alter all, if you are Captain Kirk then you should act like him. The referee should also play the game in the spirit of Star Trek, with scenarios as wacky as you like. If the role-playing game is played like the film, then it is first class; if not, it could get rather bloodthirsty. It has to be pitched right."

Reviews
Different Worlds #30 (Sept., 1983)
Arcane #15 (January 1997)
Isaac Asimov's Science Fiction Magazine

References

External links
 Trek-RPG.net — This forum discusses the FASA Star Trek game system.

 
FASA games
FASA
Role-playing games introduced in 1982